Nisshin Dam  is a rockfill dam located in Hokkaido Prefecture in Japan. The dam is used for irrigation. The catchment area of the dam is 91.3 km2. The dam impounds about 42  ha of land when full and can store 4500 thousand cubic meters of water. The construction of the dam was completed in 1973.

References

Dams in Hokkaido